Gemini may refer to:

Space
 Gemini (constellation), one of the constellations of the zodiac
 Gemini in Chinese astronomy
 Project Gemini, the second U.S. crewed spaceflight program
 Gemini Observatory, consisting of telescopes in the Northern and Southern Hemispheres
 Gemini Planet Imager, an instrument for observing extrasolar planets

Mythology
 Gemini (astrology), an astrological sign
 Gemini twins, in Greek mythology

Arts and entertainment

Comics and literature
 Gemini (DC Comics), a fictional supervillain
 Gemini (Marvel Comics), a fictional character
 Gemini, a comic series created by Jay Faerber
 Gemini Kanon, a fictional character in the manga Saint Seiya by Masami Kurumada
 Gemini Saga, a fictional character in the manga Saint Seiya by Masami Kurumada
 Gemini (magazine), a Norwegian periodical
 Gemini Publications, an American magazine publisher
 Gemini, a 2000 novel by Dorothy Dunnett
 Gemini (Les Météores), a 1975 novel by Michel Tournier
 Gemini: An Extended Autobiographical Statement on My First Twenty-five Years of Being a Black Poet, a 1971 publication by Nikki Giovanni

Film and theatre
 Gemini (1999 film) (Sôseiji), a Japanese horror film
 Gemeni (film), a 2002 Indian Telugu film also known as Gemini
 Gemini (2002 film), an Indian Tamil film starring Vikram and Kiran Rathod
 Géminis, a 2005 Argentinian film
 The Gemini (2016 film), a Burmese LGBT film
 Gemini (2017 film), an American mystery thriller film
 Gemini (play), by Albert Innaurato
 Gemini Film Circuit, a film distribution and production studio unit in Chennai, India
 Gemini Studios, a film production house in South India

Music

Performers
 Gemini (musician) (born 1990), British electronic music producer and DJ
 Gemini (Chinese band), a French-Chinese rock band
 Gemini (Hungarian band), a Hungarian rock band established in 1965
 Gemini (Portuguese band), a 1970s band
 Gemini (Swedish band), a brother-and-sister pop duo
 Gemini (rapper), also known as "Big Geminii", American rapper
 Demarco Castle, rapper/singer formerly known as "Gemini" and most recently "GemStones"
 Jemini, British pop group from Liverpool

Albums
 Gemini (Alice Nine album), 2011
 Gemini (Brian McKnight album), 2005
 Gemini (El DeBarge album), 1989
 Gemini (Gemini album), 1985
 Gemini (Macklemore album), 2017
 Gemini (Noah Reid album), 2020
 Gemini (TQ album), 2003
 Gemini (Wild Nothing album), 2010
 Gemini: Good vs. Evil, by Krayzie Bone, 2005
 Gemini, by Adrien Gallo of BB Brunes, 2014
 Gemini, by Atrocity, 2000
 Gemini, by Einstürzende Neubauten, 2003
 Gemini, by Kasia Kowalska, 1994
 Gemini, by Lana Lane, 2006
 Gemini, by Machine Girl, 2015
 Gemini, by Sherina Munaf, 2009
 Gemini, by Yoon Mi-rae (recording as T), 2002

Songs
 "Gemini" (Sponge Cola song), 2004
 "Gemini", by Alabama Shakes from Sound & Color
 "Gemini", by The Alan Parsons Project from the album Eye in the Sky
 "Gemini", by Anahí de Cárdenas from Who's That Girl?
 "Gemini", by Anne-Marie from Karate
 "Gemini", by Boards of Canada from Tomorrow's Harvest
 "Gemini", by Cane Hill from Cane Hill
 "Gemini", by D'espairsRay from Coll:set
 "Gemini", by Del Shannon
 "Gemini", by Eric Burdon and The Animals from Love Is
 "Gemini", by Israel Cruz
 "Gemini", by Jimmy Heath from Triple Threat
 "Gemini", by Jon Lord from Windows
 "Gemini", by Keith Urban from Graffiti U
 "Gemini", by Krayzie Bone from Thug on da Line
 "Gemini", by Slayer from Undisputed Attitude
 "Gemini", by Tyler Childers from Country Squire
 "Gemini", by What So Not
 "Gemini", by the Vocaloids Kagamine Rin and Len from the video game Hatsune Miku: Project DIVA 2nd
 "Gemini (Birthday Song)", by Why? from Elephant Eyelash
 "Gemini (Damn Right)", by Blanco Brown from Honeysuckle & Lightning Bugs

Other
 Gemini FM, a South-West England radio station

Television
 "Gemini" (Law & Order: Criminal Intent), a television episode
 "Gemini" (Stargate SG-1), a television episode
 "Gemini", an episode of Nowhere Man
 Gemini, a fictional villain in the animated series Thundarr the Barbarian
 Gemini Award, a Canadian television broadcasting award
 Gemini News, an Indian news channel
 Gemini TV, a Telugu-language Indian television channel
 Gemini Stone, a fictional character from Sabrina: The Animated Series
 Gemini, a two-part "clusterbot" from Robot Wars

Technology
 Gemini (company), a cryptocurrency exchange platform
 SCO Gemini, a UnixWare/OpenServer merger project by SCO
 Gemini chip, an updated version of the Apple Computer chip Mega II
 Xiaomi Mi5, an Android phone codenamed Gemini
 Gemini (PDA), an Android/Linux PDA/phone with a keyboard
 Gemini (submarine communications cable), a former subsea cable connecting the US and UK
 Gemini (protocol), an Internet protocol providing access to primarily textual documents in Gemini space
 Gemini Sound Products, a manufacturer of professional DJ equipment

Transportation

Aeronautic
 FreeX Gemini, a German two-place paraglider design
 Gemini Air Cargo, a US airline
 Gemini Powered Parachutes, an American aircraft manufacturer
 Gemini Twin, an American powered parachute design
 New Powerchutes Gemini, a South African powered parachute design
 Air Gemini, an Angolan airline
 Marsden Gemini, a research glider
 Miles Gemini, a British 1940s four-seat aircraft

Automotive
 Isuzu Gemini, a car built by Isuzu
 Holden Gemini, a car derived from the Isuzu model
 Gemini (racing car), series of racing cars built between 1959 and 1963
 Gemini, a development-stage codename for the 200Tdi Land Rover engine
 Wright Gemini (disambiguation), a series of bus chassis designs

Nautical
 Cape Cod Gemini, an American sailboat design
 MS Gemini, a cruise ship
 SuperStar Gemini (2012), a cruise ship

Other uses
 Gemini (California mountain)
 Gemini (roller coaster)
 Gemini Ganesan (1920–2005), Indian film actor
 Gemini house, a prototype solar-energy house in Austria
 Gemini Residence, a building in Copenhagen, Denmark
 GeminiJets, a die-cast model airplane manufacturer
 BGO Gemini, a Bulgarian LGBT rights organization
 Coleco Gemini, a clone of the Atari 2600 game system
 Gemini, an islet in the Tuscan Archipelago
Yahoo! Gemini, an online advertising platform

See also
 
 
 Gemeni, a village in Dârvari Commune, Mehedinți County, Romania
 Gem (disambiguation)
 Gemelli (disambiguation), Italian for twins
 Jemini, English pop band